Joan Prats (Barcelona, 1891 - Barcelona, 1970 ) was a Catalan art promoter and a close friend of Joan Miró.

Life
Joan Prats was born in 1891 to a family who sold hats. He was trained as an artist in the Llotja School, where he first met Joan Miró, who was also training there.

Prats organised exhibitions for leading Iberian artists including Salvador Dalí, Pablo Picasso, Alexander Calder and his good friend Miró. He was also associated with Paul Klee, Max Ernst, Josep Vicenç Foix and Joan Brossa.

Prats together with rationalist architect Josep Lluis Sert and avant-garde photographer Joaquim Gomis, founded the ADLAN (Amics de l'Art Nou, i.e. Friends of New Art) association, which brought together a variety of different people interested in new trends in the arts. The association lasted from 1932 to 1936 and the beginning of the Spanish Civil War.

Miró formed his foundation with Prats, which eventually led to the museum / exhibit hall in Barcelona known as Fundació Joan Miró. Prats admired Miró's ability to make things from found objects like those in The Caress of a Bird. Prats said: "When I take a stone, it is just a stone. When I grab a stone, it is a Miró."

References

" John Prats Valles . "Encyclopaedia. Barcelona: Catalan Encyclopaedia Group .
Letters to JF Garcia, 1917/1958 . Library of Catalonia , 1993, 109 -.  [Accessed: 29 August 2011].
Cirici. Catalan Contemporary Art . Edicions 62, 1970 [Accessed: 29 August 2011].
Record of John Prats: exposure Foundation ... 20 December 1995-3 March 1996 . Foundation, 1995 * [Accessed: 29 August 2011].
Five Catalan artist in homage to John Prats: Galería Joan Prats [New York, October 1982 ]. The Polígrafa, 1983 [Accessed: 29 August 2011].
Information about the work the Foundation website . " Foundation, 2011. [Accessed: 18 August 2011].

Sources
AA.DD.. The golden book of Catalan art. Ediciones Primera Plana, Barcelona, 1997.
Clavero, J. George. Foundation. Guide to the Foundation. Barcelona: Ediciones Polígrafa, 2010. DL B.10.061.2010.  .

1891 births
1970 deaths
People from Barcelona